Xinjiang University of Finance and Economics is a university in Ürümqi, Xinjiang, China. Founded in 1950, it is the key institution for the study of economics.  There is a total enrollment of more than 20,000 students. There are 1302 staff in total, including 750 full-time teachers, 36 professors and 215 associate professors. It ranks at 378th in China having an all-around score of 17.00.

Location 
The university is located at Beijing Road in the new urban area of the city.

Academics
The institute comprises 14 academic departments, namely banking, finance, accounting, business administration, statistics, information management, economics, marketing, law, computer science, foreign languages, preparatory studies, Chinese language, Marxism and Leninism, physical education, and one affiliated school for adult education. Among all the departments, finance, accounting and business administration have been chosen as Xinjiang's key provincial disciplines.

The library has more than 600,000 books.

Research
The university has set up a scientific research fund of  RMB1,000,000. It has undertaken research projects at national and provincial levels and at all other sorts of levels and won many awards. Improvement of the quality of teaching has been the central task of the institute. It has carried out a full-scale educational reforms based on the tenets of popularization, personalization, digitization, and internationalization.

See also 
 List of universities in Xinjiang
 Xinjiang
 Urumqi

References

External links 
 Ministry of Education The People's Republic of China
 Xinjiang University of Finance and Economics Website

 
Business schools in China
Education in Ürümqi
Universities and colleges in Xinjiang